Qingjian Realty is a developer based in Singapore, which is part of the Qingjian Group Co., Ltd., a conglomerate with a wide range of business operations such as contracting, investments, real estate development, capital management, logistics and more.  The parent group's projects have included the Olympic Sailing Centre, the Liuting International Airport, and residential and commercial towers.

Since 1999, the Group has been developing a wide spectrum of buildings in Singapore, including some commercial and industrial building projects.  Qingjian Realty, was involved in the Nutura Loft Bishan [HDB-DBSS] (2008), Nin Residence Potong Pasir [Condo] (2010),
RiverParc Residence Punggol [EC] (2011), RiverSound Residence Sengkang [Condo](2011) and River Isles Punggol [Condo] (2012).

Qingjian Realty was incorporated as a separate entity in 2008.

References

External links

 Punggol Town Council
 Punggol News
 Punggol Central Condo
 Punggol Condo

Real estate companies of Singapore
Condominium
2008 establishments in Singapore
Real estate companies established in 2008
Singaporean brands